Into Hot Air is a 2007 book written by American comedian and author Chris Elliott, and published by the Weinstein Company in the United States.

The book is a parody of celebrity and adventure memoirs. Its title references Jon Krakauer's 1996 Into Thin Air, a memoir of an expedition to climb Mount Everest that resulted in the deaths of eight climbers.

References

2007 non-fiction books